Sky Multichannels was a package of analogue television services offered by BSkyB on the Astra satellites at 19.2° east from 1 September 1993 to 27 September 2001, which started off with 15 channels before expanding to over 40.

History

Overview
The service started on 1 September 1993, based on the idea from chief executive officer Sam Chisholm and Rupert Murdoch of converting the company's business strategy to an entirely fee-based concept. The new package included four channels formerly available free-to-air on Astra's satellites, as well as introducing new channels.  Some of the channels had been broadcast either in the clear or soft encrypted (i.e. a VideoCrypt decoder was required, but without a subscription card) prior to their addition to the Multichannels package.

Within two months of the launch, Sky gained 400,000 new subscribers with the majority taking at least one premium channel, which helped BSkyB reach 3.5 million households by mid-1994. The service continued until the closure of BSkyB's analogue platform on 27 September 2001, due to the expansion of Sky Digital after its launch three years earlier.

Channels added later include QVC (1 October 1993) and VH1 (1 October 1994).  When VH1's German version started on 10 March 1995, VideoCrypt decoders would blank out the service to British viewers and prevent them from watching the channel for free. Nick at Nite was originally part of the Multichannels plan but did not materialize.

Channels which joined the package were paid a fee of 15 pence per subscriber per month. A European Multichannels package run by BSkyB – also using the VideoCrypt encryption system – was planned to be launched soon afterwards but did not come to fruition. A package of channels called MultiChoice Kaleidoscope launched on 1 November 1993 using VideoCrypt 2 encryption. The MultiChoice service was run by South Africa-based Network Holdings, separate from BSkyB, and initially included Filmnet and The Adult Channel as premium channels, and The Children's Channel (in Benelux only), Discovery, MTV, Country Music Television and QVC as basic channels. Sky Soap and Sky Travel launched, and were added to the package, on 3 October 1994 , but Sky News remained free-to-air. QVC was switched to free-to-view broadcasting on 7 March 1995. 1996 saw the launch of Sky 2 and a selection of channels operated in conjunction with Granada.

The launch of Astra 1D allowed Sky to further expand the Multichannels package, including the pay-per-view Box Office channels on 1 December 1997.

Promotion
BSkyB ran television advertisements prior to the new service launching. However, in 1993, the Independent Television Commission ruled against BSkyB after ten complaints regarding a number of false claims involving some of the channels which were due to be part of the package, as well as further complaints about the commercials failing to state that a one-year contract had to be taken out to take advantage of any special introductory offer.

In conjunction with the launch of the Multichannels package, all Sky networks adopted a cohesive graphical and music appearance as idents featured the logo's newly-added "ring" forming out of swirling energy streaks while the text formed out of glass copies. The graphics were produced by American graphical firm Novocom, the look for Sky News resembling their earlier work for the CBS Evening News from 1991. A new music package from composer Frank Gari dubbed the Sky Symphony was also used, with differing arrangements per channel (Sky News utilized a variant with the signature of Gari's pre-existing "Great News" package in 1989, which had been used since launch and received a slight update with the new look). The full package was used in promotional spots for what was termed as "the brand new Sky" and during periods where BSkyB channels were off the air.

To promote the Sky Multichannels package on the Astra satellites, a selection of channels was placed on Sky's preview service on transponder 47 of Astra 1C in the clear This showed promotional material in the centre of the screen and 12 channels around the edge, including some English services which were not part of the package. During football matches on Sky One, services which were also part of the Multichannels package were made available free-to-view, allowing sports subscribers to sample them. This continued until the launch of Sky Sports 2 on 19 August 1994.

Closure
Due to the growth of digital television and the Sky platform, alongside greater choice and the reduced need for channels to timeshare due to bandwidth constraints, BSkyB announced that its analogue service would cease transmission with all channels in this package closing by 2001. The first to be ceased was TV Travel Shop which became exclusive to digital in late 1999, and by February 2000 many of the channels on Astra 1D had been discontinued.

On 9 May 2001, it was announced that due to the possibility of lost revenue from the 242,000 analogue subscribers, the closure of the remaining analogue channels would be delayed from June to September. BSkyB closed down the last service in the Multichannels package was Sky One on 27 September of that year.

Channel list

1993
The subscription cost was £6.99 a month at launch, although those who signed up before 1 September 1993 could get the channels for £3.99 a month until the start of 1994. Additional packages including the multiple channels alongside one or more of Sky's premium channels were available from £11.99 to £19.99. The channels were encrypted using NDS Group's VideoCrypt system, and viewing them required a monthly subscription payment, a decoder and a valid viewing card.

1995
In 1995, the number of Sky customers exceeded five million. Sky Sports 2, Sky Soap and Sky Travel which launched on 3 October 1994 joined the package. By October and November 1995, the launch of Astra 1D allowed Sky to expand the Multichannels package further with the Sci-Fi Channel, Paramount Channel, Sky Sports Gold and History Channel, as well as the Disney Channel, Christian Channel Europe, European Business News, Television X and Playboy TV which were added to Astra 1C. QVC, which launched as part of the Multichannels package, switched to free-to-view broadcasting in this year.

Channel 11 notes (up until October 1995):
 Midnight to 6.00am: Chinese Channel – daily entertainment and news service (PAL/clear)
 8.00am to midday on weekdays: Sky Soap (PAL/VideoCrypt/Multi-channel)
 Midday to midnight on Mondays to Thursdays, and midday to 6.00pm on Fridays: Sky Travel (PAL/VideoCrypt/Multi-channel)
 6.00pm to midnight on Fridays, and 8.00am to midnight on Saturdays and Sundays: Sky Sports 2 (PAL/VideoCrypt/Sports subscription)

1996
In 1996, Sky reached six million subscribers. New channels included Sky Sports 3 (replacing Sky Sports Gold), along with Sky 2, Computer Channel, Granada Sky Broadcasting (with Plus, Men & Motors, Good Life and Talk TV), Weather Channel UK, HSN Direct, Fox Kids, Sky Scottish and Trouble (from early 1997).

1997
During 1997, but same as above:
 National Geographic Channel launches on 1 September, replacing Sky 2 as time shared with Fox Kids.
 Christian Channel Europe (4.00am to 11.00am), Sky Soap (11.00am to 4.00pm), History Channel (4.00pm to 8.00pm) and Sci-Fi Channel (8.00pm to 4.00am) moved to a new service to allow Sky Sports 2 and Sky Travel to broadcast longer, while European Business News, Trouble and Bravo continued to share a channel.
 UKTV network launched on 1 November, adding three new channels (UK Horizons, UK Style and UK Arena) which shared a service.
 Pay-per-view movies launched on Sky Box Office from 1 December 1997.

References

Direct broadcast satellite services
Telecommunications-related introductions in 1993
Sky Group
1990s in the United Kingdom
1990s in British television
1993 in British television
2000s in the United Kingdom
2000s in British television
History of television in the United Kingdom